Nicolás Repetto (born March 11, 1957) is an Argentine TV host. He worked in Fax, a talk show that received the Golden Martín Fierro Awards in 1991. He received a second Golden Martín Fierro Award in 2000.

References

Argentine game show hosts
Golden Martín Fierro Award winners
1957 births
Living people